Grunthal (German: Grünthal, 'Green Valley') is a local urban district in the Rural Municipality of Hanover, Manitoba, located 15 miles southwest of Steinbach, and about 50 minutes south of Winnipeg. It had a population of 1,680 in 2016.

Tourist attractions include Grunthal's Annual Fairdays held on the third weekend in August; it features a parade and a rodeo, among other activities. Schools include the K to Grade 4 South Oaks School and the Grades 5 to 12 Green Valley School, all part of the Hanover School Division. Grunthal includes a variety of Mennonite churches, and businesses. Its economy is primarily agrarian-based. Grunthal is also host to one of the best motocross tracks in Manitoba, in past years the track hosted numerous Canadian Motocross National events with the country's top riders coming to race. Grunthal is home to the Grunthal Red Wings, hockey teams ranging from squirts to senior.

History 
The area that is now known as Grunthal was originally lands of the nomadic Ojibway-speaking Anishinabe people.  On 3 August 1871 the Anishinabe people signed Treaty 1 and moved onto reserves such as the Brokenhead Indian Reserve and Roseau River Anishinabe First Nation Reserve.

The community of Grunthal was settled in 1876 by Plautdietsch-speaking Mennonites immigrants, from Imperial Russia, specifically the Bergthal Colony.

Grunthal was one of dozens of village of what was known as the East Reserve, an area set aside by the Government of Canada for Mennonite settlement, and it is now populated with their descendants, as well as people of Ukrainian and German descent and other ethnicities. The name Grünthal means 'Green Valley' in German, and is called Grientol, (/ˈ jrintol/), in Plautdietsch, with the same meaning.

Demographics 

Notable people
Jack Thiessen, linguist and writer

References

Designated places in Manitoba
Local urban districts in Manitoba
Unincorporated communities in Eastman Region, Manitoba